About 10.5% of Romania's population is represented by minorities (the rest of 89.5% being Romanians). The principal minorities in Romania are Hungarians (Szeklers, Csangos, and Magyars; especially in Harghita, Covasna, and Mureș counties) and Romani people, with a declining German population (in Timiș, Sibiu, Brașov, or Suceava) and smaller numbers of Poles in Bukovina (Austria-Hungary attracted Polish miners, who settled there from the Kraków region in contemporary Poland during the 19th century), Serbs, Croats, Slovaks and Banat Bulgarians (in Banat), Ukrainians (in Maramureș and Bukovina), Greeks (Brăila, Constanța), Jews (Wallachia, Bucharest), Turks and Tatars (in Constanța), Armenians, Russians (Lipovans, in Tulcea), Afro-Romanians, and others.

To this day, minority populations are greatest in Transylvania and the Banat, historical regions situated in the north and west of the country which were former territorial possessions of either the Kingdom of Hungary, the Habsburgs, or the Austrian Empire (since 1867 the dual monarchy of Austria-Hungary until World War I).

Before World War II, minorities represented more than 28% of the total population. During the war that percentage was halved, largely by the loss of the border areas of Bessarabia and northern Bukovina (to the former Soviet Union, now Republic of Moldova and Ukraine), Black Sea islands (to the former Soviet Union, now Ukraine), and southern Dobrudja (to Bulgaria), as well as by the postwar flight or deportation of ethnic Germans.

In the Romanian election law, government-recognized ethnic minorities in Romania are subject to a significantly lower threshold and have consequently won seats in the Chamber of Deputies since the fall of the Nicolae Ceauşescu regime.

Overview 
In the table below are enlisted all minority ethnic groups from Romania with more than 1,000 persons (based on the 2011 Romanian census):

Hungarian minority in Romania 

The Hungarian minority in Romania consists of 6.1% of the total population (1,227,623 citizens as per the 2011 census), being thus the largest ethnic minority of the country.

Most ethnic Hungarians live in what is today known as Transylvania (where they make up about 16.79% of the population), an area that includes the historic regions of Banat, Crișana, and Maramureș. They form a large majority of the population only in Harghita and Covasna counties and a large percentage in the Mureș county.

Greek community 

Among the towns and communes in Romania with the highest proportions of Greeks as of 2011 are Izvoarele (43.82%) and Sulina (1.69%), both in Tulcea County.

According to the Romanian census of 2002, the Greek community numbered 6,472 persons, most of whom live in Bucharest and its surrounding area. Next in line come the Dobruja counties of Tulcea and Constanța, and the Danube-facing ones of Brăila and Galați. The 1992 census however found 19,594 Greeks; this shows the tendency of assimilation. According to the General Secretariat for Greeks Abroad (a dependency of the Greek Ministry of Foreign Affairs) the Greek community in Romania numbers 14,000.

The Hellenic Union of Romania, founded in 1990, represents the political and cultural preservation interests of the community, notably by providing its representatives in the Chamber of Deputies.

See also

 Afro-Romanians
 Albanians of Romania
 Arabs in Romania
 Armenians in Romania
 Aromanians in Romania
 Banat Bulgarians
 Bulgarians in Romania
 Chinese in Romania
 Crimean Tatars in Romania
 Croats of Romania
 Danube Swabians
 Germans of Romania
 Islam in Romania
 Italians of Romania
 Jews in Romania
 Krashovani (Croats)
 Lipovans
 Macedonians in Romania
 Megleno-Romanians
 Poles in Romania
 Romani people in Romania
 Romanian ethnic minorities parties
 Serbs of Romania
 Tatars in Romania
 Turks in Romania
 Ukrainians of Romania
 Walsers – Banat French

References

External links
Romanian Government – Department for Interethnic Relations
Ministry of Education - Department for Education in the Languages of Ethnic Minorities – site in Romanian language
Ethnocultural Diversity Resource Center
Roma Women Association Romania
The Jews of Romania
Yiddish Theater. Bibliography and Discography
Diversity, another way of speaking about ethnic minorities
The Rastko Project – The Internet Library of the Serbs from Romania – in Romanian language
Romania, a Europe in miniature. Brief presentation of national minorities. report by the Romanian Government
Gerlinde Schuller: Archiving family memories and dreams – stories about the German minorities in Romania (with many archive images; English/German)

 
Demographics of Romania